Aquincum Civil Amphitheatre is an ancient structure in Budapest, Hungary, the lesser of two located in Obuda. The other is the Aquincum Military Amphitheatre. 
It was built between 250 AD and 300 AD. South of the western gate is an inscription of the Greek goddess Nemesis also known as  Rhamnousia/Rhamnusia.

External links
 

Óbuda